Chris Kavanagh may refer to:

 Chris Kavanagh (musician) (born 1964), English drummer
 Chris Kavanagh (referee) (born 1985), English football referee